Tamsita habrotima is a moth in the  family Erebidae. It was described by Tams in 1930. It is found in Kenya and Uganda.

References

Natural History Museum Lepidoptera generic names catalog

Moths described in 1930
Lymantriinae